Socialist Vanguard Party (in Spanish: Partido Vanguardia Socialista) was a front created by the Peruvian Communist Party in order to facilitate its legal registration in 1945.

Political parties established in 1945
Defunct political parties in Peru
Communist parties in Peru